Edward Ball (1793 – 9 November 1865) was an English Conservative Party politician.

He was elected at the 1852 general election as a Member of Parliament (MP) for Cambridgeshire, and held the seat until he resigned his seat on 7 January 1863 by the procedural device of accepting appointment as the Steward of the Chiltern Hundreds.

References

External links 
 

1793 births
1865 deaths
Conservative Party (UK) MPs for English constituencies
UK MPs 1852–1857
UK MPs 1857–1859
UK MPs 1859–1865